In the 1970–71 season, USM Alger is competing in the Championnat National for the 5th season, as well as the Algerian Cup. They will be competing in Championnat National, and the Algerian Cup.

Summary season
In 1970–71 Algerian Cup after a long march due to playing the quarter and semi-finals in home and away system Al-Ittihad reached the final to face in the Algiers Derby, MC Alger and be defeated again. before her in the semi-finals in Khenchela against the local team, Al-Ittihad was not welcomed because of a word used by USM Alger supporters which is that Khenchela is “Shawiya” a term that has been misinterpreted and they prepared a hostile reception, and the match lasted four hours due to the storming to the stadium several times by the supporters. After the end of the match USM Alger players who were accompanied by a handful of fans, remained locked in the dressing rooms until midnight and after the intervention of a Gendarmerie brigade sent from Batna. his return to Algiers was around 9 am the next day, then the Algerian Football Federation at that time punished the two clubs by playing 50 kilometers away from its stadium for one year. As for USM Alger it received in the 1971–72 season at Stade des Frères Brakni. USM Alger again participated in the Maghreb Cup Winners Cup as a runner-up of the Algerian Cup, finished in the last place with two defeats against Club Africain and Wydad Casablanca.

Squad list
Players and squad numbers last updated on 1 September 1970.Note: Flags indicate national team as has been defined under FIFA eligibility rules. Players may hold more than one non-FIFA nationality.

Competitions

Overview

Division Nationale

League table

Results by round

Matches

Algerian Cup

Maghreb Cup Winners Cup

Squad information

Playing statistics
Only 5 games from 31 

|-
! colspan=14 style=background:#dcdcdc; text-align:center| Goalkeepers

|-
! colspan=14 style=background:#dcdcdc; text-align:center| Defenders

|-
! colspan=14 style=background:#dcdcdc; text-align:center| Midfielders

|-
! colspan=14 style=background:#dcdcdc; text-align:center| Forwards

Goalscorers
Includes all competitive matches. The list is sorted alphabetically by surname when total goals are equal.

References

USM Alger seasons
Algerian football clubs 1970–71 season